Daghagheleh may refer to:
 Daghagheleh, Ahvaz
 Daghagheleh, Hoveyzeh